This is a list of lunar sample displays from the Apollo program that were distributed through the United States and around the world. They include samples from the Apollo 11 and Apollo 17 missions conducted by NASA in 1969 and 1972.

The Apollo 11 mission to the surface of the Moon returned a few dozen pounds/kilos of lunar material (mainly rock and dust), and the US put about 0.05 grams in small display cases and gave one apiece to the 50 U.S. states, to the nations of the world, and to political entities like the U.S. territories under administration. This was done again with an Apollo 17 sample (Lunar basalt 70017).  There are a few samples from Apollo 15 on display.

United States

International 
The display cases included a lunar sample and small flag of the respective political entity that had been to the Moon and back. Approximately 135 displays were gifted to nations of the world at that time, so nations created since then are not included and some displays have been inherited from past nations

Footnotes

See also

Apollo 11 goodwill messages (Messages by nations left on the Moon)
Stolen and missing Moon rocks

References

External links
Lunar Sample Display locations (in .pdf)
Collect Space - Moonrock list
  Kentucky's Goodwill Moon rock display in the Kentucky Historical Society's objects catalog

United States diplomacy-related lists
1970s-related lists
Geology-related lists
Apollo lunar sample displays